Hort may refer to:

People 
 Erik Hort (born 1987), American soccer player 
 F. J. A. Hort (1828–1892), Irish theologian

 Greta Hort (1903–1967), Danish-born literature professor
 Josiah Hort (c. 1674–1751), English clergyman of the Church of Ireland
 Vlastimil Hort (born 1944), Czech chess grandmaster
 Hort baronets

Other uses 
 Hort, Hungary, a settlement in Heves county
 Hort., an abbreviation which indicates that a name for a plant saw significant use in the horticultural literature but was never properly published

See also 
 Hart (disambiguation)
 Hurt (disambiguation)